Lewiston (officially the City of Lewiston, Maine) is the second largest city in the U.S. state of Maine and the most central city in Androscoggin County. The city lies halfway between Augusta, the state's capital, and Portland, the state's most populous city. It is one-half of the Lewiston-Auburn Metropolitan Statistical Area, commonly referred to as "L/A." or "L-A." Lewiston exerts a significant impact upon the diversity, religious variety, commerce, education, and economic power of Maine. It is known for an overall low cost of living, substantial access to medical care, and a low violent-crime rate. In recent years, the City of Lewiston has also seen a spike in economic and social growth. While the dominant language spoken in the city is English, it is home to a significant Somali population as well as the largest French-speaking population in the United States (by population) while it is second to St. Martin Parish, Louisiana, in percentage of speakers.

The Lewiston area traces its roots to 1669 with the early presence of the Androscoggin tribe (the namesake of the county in which the city resides). In the late 18th century, in 1795, Lewiston was incorporated as Lewistown. The presence of the Androscoggin River and Lewistown Falls made the town an attractive area for manufacturing and hydro-power businesses. The rise of Boston rail and textile tycoon Benjamin Bates saw rapid economic growth rivaling that of Cambridge, Worcester, and Concord. Irish immigrants were recruited to build the railroad links and dig the canals for the textile mills. The Irish stayed, and worked the mills and established flourishing businesses, as evidenced by the McGillicuddy, Callahan, and other Blocks and the St.Joseph's and St.Patrick's churches. In the 1850 Census Lewiston was fully 23% Irish born. The increase in economic stimulus prompted thousands of Quebecers to migrate, causing a population boom; the populace rose from 1,801 in 1840 to 21,701 in 1890. In 1855, local preacher Oren Burbank Cheney founded the Maine State Seminary, the first coeducational university in New England and one of the first universities to admit black students before the Emancipation Proclamation. Lewistown quickly became associated with the liberal arts and was incorporated as "Lewiston" in 1864, a year before the college was chartered as Bates College.

The city is home to the only basilica in Maine, Basilica of Saints Peter and Paul; 5 colleges and universities; 44 listings on the National Register of Historic Places; the Androscoggin Bank Colisée; the Stephens Observatory; the Olin Arts Center; the Bates College Museum of Art (BCMoA); and two significant general hospitals: Central Maine Medical Center and Saint Mary's Regional Medical Center. The city's population was 37,121 at the 2020 United States Census.

History

Conception
Prior to European colonization, the region of Lewiston was inhabited by the Androscoggin, an Abenaki people. During the 17th century, Androscoggin were among the first Native American tribes to make contact with European colonists in Maine. Tensions soon deteriorated over colonial expansion, and conflicts with colonists and epidemics of infectious diseases devastated the Androscoggin, which responded by migrating to New France from 1669 onwards. By 1680, the Androscoggin had been completely driven out of Maine. The governor of New France, Louis de Buade, allocated them two seigneuries on the Saint Francis River.

Colonial beginnings
A grant comprising the area of Lewiston was given to Moses Little and Jonathan Bagley, members of the Pejepscot Proprietors, on January 28, 1768, on the condition that fifty families live in the area before June 1, 1774. Bagley and Little named the new town Lewistown. Paul Hildreth was the first man to settle in Lewiston in the fall of 1770. By 1795, Lewiston was officially incorporated as a town. At least four houses that have survived from this period are currently listed on the National Register of Historic Places.

King Avenue and Ralph Avenue were named after Ralph Luthor King, who owned the land near the fairgrounds. Elliott Avenue was named after his wife, Grace O. Elliott, whose son eventually built the family home at 40 Wellman Street.

Industrial development and Benjamin Bates

Lewiston was a slow but steadily growing farm town throughout its early history. By the early-to-mid-19th century, however, as water power was being honed, Lewiston's location on the Androscoggin River would prove to make it a perfect location for emerging industry. In 1809, Michael Little built a large wooden sawmill next to the falls. Burned in 1814 by an arsonist, it was later rebuilt. In 1836, local entrepreneurs—predominantly the Little family and friends—formed the Androscoggin Falls Dam, Lock & Canal Company:...for the purpose of erecting and constructing dams, locks, canals, mills, works, machines, and buildings on their own lands and also manufacturing cotton, wool, iron, steel, and paper in the towns of Lewiston, Minot, and Danville.

The sales of stock attracted Boston investors—including Thomas J. Hill, Lyman Nichols, George L. Ward and Alexander De Witt. De Witt convinced textile and rail tycoon Benjamin Bates, then-President of the Union Pacific Railroad, to come to Lewiston and fund the emerging Lewiston Water Power Company. Soon after Bates arrived, the company created the first canal in the city. In the spring of 1850, some 400 Irish men recruited in and around Boston by construction contractor Patrick O'Donnell arrived in Lewiston and began work on the canal system. Impressed with the labor force and "working spirit" of the Lewistonions, Bates founded the Bates Manufacturing Company, leading to the construction of 5 mills starting with Bates Mill No. 1. In August 1850, Maine Governor John Hubbard signed the incorporation act and the mill was completed 1852. Bates positioned the mill in Lewiston due to the location of the Lewiston Falls which provided the mill with power. Under Bates' supervision, during the Civil War, the mill produced textiles for the Union Army. His mills generated employment for thousands of Irish, Canadians, and immigrants from Europe. The mill was Maine's largest employer for three decades.

This company began Lewiston's transformation from a small farming town into a textile manufacturing center on the model of Lowell, Massachusetts. The creation of the Bates manufacturing trusts saw rapid economic growth, positioning the city as the wealthiest city in Maine, and created budding affluent districts such as the Main Street–Frye Street Historic District. Although the odd-majority of the population was working class, a distinctive upper class emerged at this time. The Bates Mill remained the largest employer in Lewiston from the 1850s to the mid-late 20th century.

Railroad construction was key to the development of both Lewiston and its neighbor, Auburn. In 1849, the Androscoggin & Kennebec railroad, running through Lewiston and Auburn, connected these towns to Waterville and the St. Lawrence & Atlantic Railway line between Portland, Maine, and Montreal, Quebec. The Androscoggin & Kennebec Railroad was constructed by Irish laborers, many of whom joined the Lewiston canal construction crews in 1850. The Irish laborers and their families lived in shanty-town neighborhoods called "patches". By 1854, one quarter of Lewiston's population was Irish, the highest concentration in any settlement in Maine. Subsequently, trains connected Quebec with Lewiston on a daily schedule. During the Civil War, the high demand for textiles helped Lewiston develop a strong industrial base through the Bates Enterprise. However, the concentration of wealth in Benjamin Bates sparked the 1861 Lewiston cotton riots which prompted him to give thousands of dollars back to the city and expand the employment opportunities at his mills. In 1861, a flood of French-Canadian immigration into Maine began, spawned by industrial work opportunities in Maine cities with water power from waterfalls. This brought a significant influx of Québécois millworkers who worked alongside Irish immigrants and Yankee mill girls. Lewiston's population boomed between 1840 and 1890 from 1,801 to 21,701. Canadiens settled in an area downtown that became known as Little Canada, and Lewiston's character has remained largely Franco-American ever since. In 1855, a Maine preacher traveled from Parsonsfield to Lewiston to establish an institution of higher learning in the city. In 1855, the Maine State Legislature was petitioned by Lewiston locals to found the Maine State Seminary. The school opened in 1855, and educated the working class of Maine while also providing education for blacks and women at a time when other universities barred their entrance. At its founding, it became the first coeducational college in New England and one of the earliest proponents of abolitionism.

During this time, in 1863, Lewiston was incorporated as a city. In 1872, St. Peter's church was built in Lewiston. This was the first French-Canadian national church in Maine. In 1864, the Maine State Seminary was renamed Bates College in honor of Benjamin Bates.

In 1880, Le Messager, a French-language newspaper, began printing in Lewiston to serve its predominant ethnic population. The local Kora Shrine was organized in 1891 and held its first meetings in a Masonic temple on Lisbon Street. This group would from 1908 to 1910 build the Kora Temple on Sabattus Street, the largest home of a fraternal organization in the state. Architect George M. Coombs designed this Moorish-style structure.

City leaders decided to build a cathedral to which the Roman Catholic Diocese of Portland could relocate. Construction of the Church of Saints Peter and Paul began in 1905 and ended in 1938, funded mostly through thousands of small donations from Lewiston residents. It is the largest Roman Catholic Church in Maine, and Lewiston's most prominent landmark. While the Diocese of Portland did not relocate to Lewiston, the church nevertheless became a basilica in 2004. It is one of the few American basilicas outside of a major metropolitan area.

Lewiston-Auburn Shoe Strike

In 1937, one of the largest labor disputes in Maine history occurred in Lewiston and Auburn. The Lewiston-Auburn Shoe Strike lasted from March to June and at its peak involved 4,000 to 5,000 workers on strike. After workers attempted to march across the Androscoggin River from Lewiston to Auburn, Governor Lewis Barrows sent in the Maine Army National Guard. Some labor leaders, among them CIO Secretary Powers Hapgood, were imprisoned for months after a Maine Supreme Judicial Court judge issued an injunction seeking to end the strike.

Textile investment

After World War I, profits from the textile industry in New England mill towns such as Lewiston; Biddeford; Manchester, New Hampshire; Waterbury, Connecticut; and Fall River, Haverhill, Lawrence and Lowell, Massachusetts began to decline. Businesses began moving to the South due to lower costs of power from more modern technologies (Lewiston's water wheel technology gave way to hydroelectricity, cheaper transportation (as most cotton and materials came from the South), and cheaper labor).

Starting in the late 1950s, many of Lewiston's textile mills began closing. This gradually led to a run-down and abandoned downtown area. Chain stores located downtown—Woolworth's, W. T. Grant, S. S. Kresge, JC Penney and Sears Roebuck—shut their doors or moved to malls on the outskirts of Lewiston or Auburn. The city's flagship department store, the four-story B. Peck & Co., closed in 1982 after more than a century in business. As businesses and jobs began to leave the city, people followed. The population stopped increasing at its previous rate and began to slowly decline after 1970, then at a greater rate in  the 1990s.

Economic diversification and renaissance
After a difficult economic period in the 1980s that saw high unemployment and downtown stagnation, several key events have led to economic and cultural growth, including the transformation of the historic Bates Mill Complex. Because the city took over the complex in 1992 after back taxes went unpaid, years of taxpayer frustration in the city's need to maintain the  behemoth led to two referendums (one non-binding vote, the other binding). Voters soundly supported the need to pursue redevelopment by maintaining the property and selling it to private developers. In 2001, the city sold three mill buildings to local developers. In 2003, Platz Associates sold the Bates Mill Complex, with the exception of Mill 5 and a small support building. For the next four years, a number of business enterprises expanded after Platz redeveloped the mill building. The Bates Mill complex was listed on the National Register of Historic Places in December 2010.

In May 2004, the city officials announced a plan for urban renewal near the downtown area. The plan was to demolish several blocks of 19th-century millworker housing, lay new streets with updated infrastructure, construct more owner-occupied, lower-density housing, and build a boulevard through one neighborhood using federal Community Development Block Grant funds provided over a period of ten years. Some residents of the affected neighborhoods felt that the plan was initially announced with little input from them. They formed a neighborhood group called "The Visible Community", which has since been actively involved in the planning process, and resulted in cooperation between neighbors and city officials to redesign Kennedy Park, including input on the location of new basketball courts, and feedback regarding creation of the largest all-concrete skate park in Maine.

Downtown is home to a new headquarters for Oxford Networks, along with a $20-million upgrade in local fiber-optics, a new auto parts store, a campus of the for-profit Kaplan University, the headquarters for Northeast Bank, a parking garage, and the newly renovated Maine Supply Co. building, listed on the National Register of Historic Places. That facility is now called the Business Service Center at Key Bank Plaza, and is home to the local Chamber of Commerce, the Lewiston-Auburn Economic Growth Council, and an arrangement with a number of business service providers.

The area's renaissance has gained local, regional, and national recognition. In 2002 and again in 2006, the L-A area led the state in economic development activity, according to the Maine Department of Economic and Community Development's list of business investments and expansions. In a 2006 KPMG International study measuring the cost of locating and maintaining a business, Lewiston ranked first among the New England communities analyzed, and finished 24th out of 49 U.S. communities analyzed.

Lewiston earned a 2007 All-America City Award designation by the National Civic League. The national competition "recognizes communities whose residents work together to identify and tackle community-wide challenges and achieve measurable, uncommon results." 10 cities are selected as All-America Cities each year.

In 2017, Forbes Magazine named Lewiston one of its top 25 places to retire, citing relatively low cost of living, good access to medical care, and extremely low violent crime rate.

Somali and Bantu migration

In 1999, the United States government began preparations to resettle an estimated 12,000 refugees from Somalia to select cities throughout the United States. Most of the early arrivals in the United States settled in Clarkston, Georgia, a city adjacent to Atlanta. However, they were mostly assigned to low-rent, poverty-stricken inner-city areas, so many began to look to resettle elsewhere in the U.S.Word soon spread that Lewiston had a low crime rate, good schools and cheap housing. In 1999, ethnic Somalis subsequently began a secondary migration from other states to the former mill town, and after 2005, many Somali Bantus, a separate ethnicity, followed suit.

In October 2002, then-Mayor Laurier T. Raymond wrote an open letter addressed to leaders of the Somali community, predicting a negative impact on the city's social services and requesting that they discourage further relocation to Lewiston. The letter angered some persons and prompted some community leaders and residents to speak out against the mayor, drawing national attention. Demonstrations were held in Lewiston, both by those who supported the immigrants' presence and those who opposed it.

In January 2003, about 32 members of a white nationalist group from Illinois demonstrated in Lewiston to denounce Somali immigrants.  This prompted a simultaneous counter-demonstration on the campus of Bates College to demonstrate support of the Somali community. The rally repudiating the white nationalists attracted 4,000 attendees, including governor John Baldacci, Senators Olympia Snowe and Susan Collins and other officials. Mayor Raymond was reportedly out of town on vacation on the day of the protests.

In August 2010, the Lewiston Sun Journal reported that Somali entrepreneurs had helped reinvigorate downtown Lewiston by opening shops in previously closed storefronts. Amicable relations were also reported by the local Franco-American merchants and the Somali storekeepers.

Somali farmers have had a positive impact on Lewiston agriculture life. Farming was known to be "low caste" to Somalis, before they were forced to labor during slavery. Since migrating to Maine farming has become a part of life to some Somalis.

Somali-American players contributed to the Lewiston High School boys soccer team's state championship wins in 2015, 2017, and 2018 under coach Mike McGraw.

National Register of Historic Places listings

 Androscoggin Mill Block
 Atkinson Building
 Bergin Block
 Bradford House
 Captain Holland House
 College Block-Lisbon Block
 Continental Mill Housing
 Cowan Mill
 Dominican Block
 Dr. Louis J. Martel House
 Dr. Milton Wedgewood House
 First Callahan Building
 First McGillicuddy Block
 First National Bank
 Grand Trunk Railroad Station
 Hathorn Hall, Bates College
 Healey Asylum
 Holland-Drew House
 James C. Lord House
 John D. Clifford House
 Jordan School
 Kora Temple
 Lewiston City Hall
 Lewiston Public Library
 Lewiston Trust and Safe Deposit Company
 Lord Block
 Lower Lisbon Street Historic District
 Lyceum Hall
 Maine Supply Company Building
 Manufacturer's National Bank
 Marcotte Nursing Home
 Oak Street School
 Odd Fellows Block
 Osgood Building
 Pilsbury Block
 Philip M. and Deborah N. Isaacson House
 Saint Mary's General Hospital
 Savings Bank Block
 Second Callahan Block
 Sen. William P. Frye House
 St. Joseph's Catholic Church
 Basilica of Saints Peter and Paul
 Trinity Episcopal Church
 US Post Office-Lewiston Maine
 Union Block

Geography

Lewiston is drained by the Androscoggin River, which forms its western border. The city is bordered by Auburn beyond the river, as well as the towns of Greene, Sabattus, and Lisbon. It is between Portland, the state's largest city and cultural center, and the state capital of Augusta.

Neighborhoods

Downtown
Downtown Lewiston runs from Oxford Street up to Jefferson Street, and from Adams Avenue to Main Street. This is the city's most densely settled area, home to about half the population. It contains mostly housing, although on Lisbon Street and Main Street, it is entirely businesses. This neighborhood was once the commercial hub of the whole county, but with the city's economic decline, many downtown stores closed and the former mill housing became run-down, resulting in fallen land values. But like many post-industrial centers, there has followed a period of renovation and revitalization that continues today.

This neighborhood includes:
 Lisbon Street Business District
 Country Kitchen Bread Factory
 Tree Street Youth Center
 Lewiston City Hall 
 Lewiston Public Library
 Bates Mill Complex
 The Root Cellar 
 Kennedy Park
 The Public Theatre
 S.S. Peter and Paul Basilica
 Agora Grand Event Center, formerly St. Patrick's Church
 St. Joseph's Church
 Central Maine Medical Center
 Railroad Park
 Androscoggin Bank Colisée
 Webb's Market
 Farmers Market

Webster Street neighborhood
Consisting mostly of suburban mid-income housing, this neighborhood runs between Lisbon and Webster Streets, East Avenue, and Alfred Plourde Parkway. Schools that serve this neighborhood are Farwell Elementary, Martel Elementary, Lewiston Middle School, and Lewiston High School.

Pond Road neighborhood
This neighborhood is bounded by the triangle formed by Pond Road, Randall Road, and Sabattus Street (Route 126). This neighborhood is mostly mid-income suburban residential. McMahon Elementary, Lewiston Middle School, and Lewiston High School serve the area.

Climate
Lewiston has a humid continental climate, with very significant temperature variation throughout the year. Summers are usually short, warm, and humid, while winters tend to be very cold, long, and snowy. Lewiston averages  of snow annually, although this number varies greatly from winter to winter. Snow tends to be the dominant form of precipitation between late November and late March, although freezing rain, sleet, and rain can also occur in the winter when large low pressure systems track directly over or west of the city. Summer in Lewiston typically consists of pleasant temperatures, although high humidity can make the temperature feel more uncomfortable at times. Severe summertime storms, such as tornadoes and tropical cyclones are rare, but not unheard of.

Demographics

2010 census
As of the 2010 census, there were 36,592 people, 15,267 households, and 8,622 families residing in the city. The racial makeup of the city was 86.6% White, 8.7% Black, 0.4% American Indian and Alaska Native, 1.0% Asian, 2.0% Hispanic or Latino (of any race), 0.6% from some other race, and 2.6% from two or more races.

In 2010, there were 15,267 households, of which 27.5% had children under the age of 18 living with them, 37.5% were married couples living together, 13.7% had a female householder with no husband present, 5.2% had a male householder with no wife present, and 43.5% were non-families. Of all households, 34.4% were made up of individuals, and 12.5% had someone living alone who was 65 years of age or older. The average household size was 2.26 and the average family size was 2.90.

The median age in the city was 37.4 years. 22.1% of residents were under the age of 18; 12.9% were between the ages of 18 and 24; 24.1% were from 25 to 44; 25.3% were from 45 to 64; and 15.5% were 65 years of age or older. The gender makeup of the city was 48.1% male and 51.9% female.

2000 census
As of the 2000 census, there were 35,690 people, 15,290 households, and 8,658 families residing in the city. The racial makeup of the city was 95.7% White, 1.1% Black or African American, 0.3% American Indian and Alaska Native, 0.8% Asian, 1.3% Hispanic or Latino (of any race), 0.4% from some other race, and 1.7% from two or more races.

People of French-American descent were by far the most represented ethnic group in Lewiston, with 29.4% being of French-Canadian descent and 18.3% French (the two were listed as separate categories in the census although the vast majority were of French-Canadian descent). Following French were Irish at 10.2% and English at 9.9%.

There were 15,290 households, out of which 25.4% had children under the age of 18 living with them, 40.9% were married couples living together, 11.8% had a female householder with no husband present, and 43.4% were non-families. Of all households, 35.9% were made up of individuals, and 13.7% had someone living alone who was 65 years of age or older. The average household size was 2.17 and the average family size was 2.81.

The median income for a household in the city was $36,743, and the median income for a family was $46,289. Males had a median income of $38,881 versus $30,465 for females. The per capita income for the city was $20,014. About 16% of families and 21.7% of the population were below the poverty line, including 35.8% of those under age 18 and 17.7% of those age 65 or over.

Native language
Survey Year 2000 Source:

Voter registration

Politics

Economy

Large businesses
 Central Maine Medical Center: Founded by Edward H. Hill in the mid-1860s CMMC (Central Maine Medical Center) is downtown at High Street. The campus includes several large parking facilities, a LifeFlight of Maine helipad. In recent years the hospital has created the Central Maine Heart and Vascular Institute, and the Patrick Dempsey Center for Cancer Hope & Healing. The hospital has approximately 250 beds, and approximately 300 physicians. It is a Level II trauma center. Central Maine Medical Center is the flagship hospital of Central Maine Medical Family. The organization runs two other hospitals, one in Bridgton and another in Rumford. It also operates CMMC College of Nursing and Health Professions; and many affiliated long-term care facilities, clinics and practices throughout central and western Maine. The current president of the hospital chain is Peter E. Chalke. The Central Maine Medical Family is a block away from the hospital on Bates Street in the Lowell Square Building, a refurbished textile factory. CMMC recently underwent major renovations to their emergency department.
 Country Kitchen Bakery: Country Kitchen is downtown between Lisbon and Park streets. Owned by Georgia-based Flowers Foods, Country Kitchen currently services all of the United States. It operates a second factory a few hundred feet away between Canal and Lincoln streets.
 Walmart Distribution Center: Walmart currently operates a  warehousing facility in Lewiston. It is the state's largest facility, and is one mile (1.6 km) from exit 80 on I-95 on Alfred A. Plourde Parkway. This facility currently services all New England Walmarts.
 Sun Journal: The Sun Journal is a daily newspaper that is headquartered on Park Street. It operates several different offices throughout Central and Western Maine. In Androscoggin County it prints the City Edition, news about the Lewiston-Auburn area. They also print the Oxford County, Franklin County, and State Editions. It is the third largest newspaper in the state.
 Modula - System Logistics: An engineering and manufacturing company which designs and builds automated storage equipment used in distribution centers around the country.
Sazerac Company, the owner of Boston Brands of Maine, purchased the White Rock bottling plant in Lewiston on Saratoga Street where they run a 24/7 production of the popular Fireball Cinnamon Whiskey.

Lisbon Street
 Downtown Lisbon Street: Lisbon Street is the commercial and government center of Lewiston. In its downtown section, it features many law offices, the city library, the district court, Senator Susan Collins' office, several stores created by and for the Somali community, and a variety of restaurants and shops including Forage Market, The Vault, Marche, Kimball Street Studios, Dube's Flowers, FUEL Restaurant, Orchid, Mother India, J Dostie Jewelers, and Bear Bones Beer.  Downtown Lisbon Street is also home to the Emerge Film Festival as well as Art Walks on the last Friday of each month during summer.
 Upper Lisbon Street: Past downtown features several malls, including the Lewiston Promenade Mall and the Lewiston Mall. There are also many chain restaurants, some car dealerships, and many other private businesses.

Main Street

U.S. Route 202 and Maine State Routes 11 and 100 are co-signed along Main Street.

 Downtown Main Street: Main Street starts near the downtown area at the Governor James B. Longley Memorial Bridge, which crosses from Auburn. Crossing into Lewiston, one passes Veterans Memorial Park, a large park on the waterfront that commemorates all veterans. Next is a small hydro-plant that was used to power the textile mills on Canal Street. After the canal bridge there is the downtown section of Main Street. It features the L.L. Bean Call Center in the Peck Building, a TD Bank branch, the former St. Joseph's Church, Central Maine Medical Center, in addition to many other businesses.
 Upper Main Street: Past downtown there are several businesses and several chain stores and restaurants, but it is mostly residential. The street is lined with large 19th-century Victorian mansions, some of which remain houses and some which have been converted into doctors' offices.

Top employers
According to Lewiston's 2011 Comprehensive Annual Financial Report, the top employers in the city are:

Arts and culture

Library
 The Lewiston Public Library has played a major role in the emerging culture of Lewiston. It was renovated and expanded in 1996. The library is downtown on the corner of Lisbon Street and Pine Street and has over 150,000 items in its collection. Recently, it opened the Marsden Hartley Cultural Center, holding various community events such as concerts, lectures, and film festivals.

Museums
 Museum L-A: Museum L-A is a museum in a former textile factory building. It honors the people who worked and lived in this community. At Museum L-A visitors can walk through a simulated production line, then view exhibits covering the textile, shoe, and brick industries that once thrived in Lewiston and Auburn. The museum is in Bates Mill Number 4 in the Bates Mill Complex. In June 2009 the museum acquired Camden Mill and plans on moving to those facilities once it is refurbished.
 The Bates College Museum of Art features a wide variety of art. The art students at this school create much of this city's art life.
 The Atrium Gallery: at the University of Southern Maine campus in Lewiston. This Museum features a wide variety of art.

The Franco Center
The Franco Center opened in 2000 in what was formerly St. Mary's Parish. The performing arts center programs events for both Franco-American related performances as well as other cultural displays, such as the Center's Piano and Celtic Series. The diverse programming of the venue hosts both local and international performers. The Center also hosts events and serves as a museum of the city's Franco-American past with historical artifacts and documentation on display as well as a small library.

The Public Theatre
Lewiston also features The Public Theatre, which puts on different plays throughout the year with about six to eight productions per season. It is downtown on Maple St. It was on Park street. It features all types of plays, with actors from all over the world. Its offices are in Auburn at the Great Falls Plaza.

Events

Emerge Film Festival
The Emerge Film Festival was first held in June 2014 in downtown Lewiston and Auburn. In 2019 the festival was held at Rinck Advertising and the Franco Center.

The Great Falls Balloon Festival
The Great Falls Balloon Festival is an event that is held one weekend in August every year. The Festival includes launching of balloons, games, and carnival rides. The launch sites take place at several open parks on the Lewiston-Auburn Androscoggin Riverfront. People come from all around the country and Canada to see the festivities.

Festival Franco
Formerly known as Festival de Joie, Festival FrancoFun is held annually at the Androscoggin Bank Colisée and is a celebration of the city's Franco-American heritage. The festival features performances from French-Canadian musicians as well as native French-Canadian food.

Liberty Festival
Held on July 4 of each year, the festival is the name given to the fireworks event over the Great Falls of the Androscoggin River in between the twin cities. The fireworks are launched in West Pitch Park in Auburn. Major viewpoints of the fireworks are Veterans Park, railroad Park and Great Falls Plaza in Auburn.

Patrick Dempsey Challenge
Lewiston hosts the annual Dempsey Challenge, which began in 2009. The event, hosted by Lewiston-native Patrick Dempsey, in a run/walk and cycling fundraiser for cancer research. In its opening year the event raised over one million dollars. The event has attracted famous athletes from all around including participants in the Tour de France. All the proceeds go to the Patrick Dempsey Center for Cancer Hope at the Central Maine Medical Center.

Sports and recreation

The Androscoggin Bank Colisée

The center of sports in Lewiston is the Androscoggin Bank Colisée (formerly known as the Central Maine Civic Center). The Lewiston Maineiacs, the only American team to have played in the Quebec Major Junior Hockey League, played their first season in 2003–2004 and dissolved the team after the 2010–2011 season. The Colisée is also the home to the state Class A and Class B high school hockey championships each year. The city as a whole is known for its strong passion for the game of hockey, likely related to its French American heritage. Two Lewiston schools, Lewiston High School and St. Dominic Regional High School (now in Auburn), combine for over half of the state class A high school hockey championships in the state's history. During the 2013–2014 American Hockey League season, the Portland Pirates played their first 12 home games at the Colisée while the Cumberland County Civic Center is being renovated.

The junior Maine Nordiques of the North American Hockey League have played their home games at the Colisée since 2019.

Ali vs. Liston rematch
In May 1965, Lewiston became the venue for a heavyweight title rematch between Muhammad Ali and Sonny Liston; Ali had defeated Liston in a controversial fight in Miami Beach, Florida in February 1964, and the World Boxing Council was demanding an immediate rematch, which was against World Boxing Association rules (the WBA eventually stripped Ali of their title). The rematch was originally planned to be held in Boston, but was halted by Massachusetts boxing authorities due to licensing issues. Promoters were eventually able to frame a lucrative deal moving the fight to the Colisée in Lewiston. As the venue held less than 3,700 spectators, only 2,434 fans were present, setting an all-time record for the lowest attendance for a heavyweight championship match. The fight was the scene of the famous photograph of Ali standing over Liston taunting him with his glove. Ali won by first round knockout.

Lewiston Twins (1891–1930) 
Lewiston was home to minor league baseball. Beginning in 1891, Lewiston was home to the Lewiston Twins and other teams, who played in various seasons through 1930. Lewiston teams played as members of the New England League (1891–1896, 1901), Maine State League (1907), Atlantic Association (1908) and New England League (1914–1915, 1919, 1926–1930). Baseball Hall of Fame member Jesse Burkett managed the Lewiston Twins in 1928 and 1929. Between 1901 and 1919, Lewiston teams played home games at A.A.A. Park. Beginning in 1926, the Lewiston Twins played home games at Lewiston Athletic Park.

Maine Nordiques (1973–1977)
The Maine Nordiques were a professional hockey team that operated in the former North American Hockey League from 1973 to 1977. They were based at the Central Maine Youth Center in Lewiston. The Nordiques served as a farm club for the Quebec Nordiques of the World Hockey Association.

Lewiston Maineiacs

The Lewiston Maineiacs were a major junior hockey team that played in the Quebec Major Junior Hockey League (QMJHL). The Maineiacs moved to Lewiston in 2003 from Sherbrooke, Quebec, and were the only team in the QMJHL in the United States. They played their home games at the Androscoggin Bank Colisée. In 2006–2007, the Maineiacs won the Jean Rougeau Trophy for having the best record in the QMJHL, won the President's Cup as QMJHL playoff champion, and represented the league at the 2007 Memorial Cup. Several Maineiacs alumni have played in the National Hockey League, including Jaroslav Halák, Jonathan Bernier, David Perron and Alexandre Picard. The Maineiacs were disbanded in 2011.

Lewiston/Auburn Nordiques

The Lewiston/Auburn Nordiques were a Tier III junior ice hockey team that played in the North American 3 Hockey League. During the 2018–2019 season the team recorded a 50–5 record, winning the NA3HL regular season championship and the Coastal Division championship. The team also made it to the Fraser Cup finals this season, losing a close game to the Texas Brahmas 2–1. The team ceased operations after the 2019–2020 season.

Maine Nordiques (2019–present)

 
The Maine Nordiques are a Tier II junior ice hockey team in the North American Hockey League's East Division. They started play during the 2019–2020 season at the Androscoggin Bank Colisée. The team is coached by Nolan Howe, grandson of Gordie Howe and son of Mark Howe.

Education
Lewiston's public education system has recently seen a number of new buildings constructed for Farwell Elementary School and Pettingill School, now replaced with the 600 student capacity Geiger Elementary School. Plans to redo the city's Thomas J. McMahon School are under way.

The city is also home to and often associated with liberal arts Bates College.

Colleges and universities

 Maine College of Health Professions
 Bates College
 University of Southern Maine – Lewiston/Auburn Campus
 Central Maine Community College – Auburn

Public schools

Lewiston Public Schools operates public schools.
 Lewiston High School (9–12) 1,446 students
 Lewiston Regional Technical Center (9–12)
 Lewiston Middle School (7–8)
 Farwell Elementary School (K–6)
 Raymond A Geiger Elementary School (K–6)
 Robert V. Connors Elementary School (K–6)
 Montello School (K–6)
 Thomas J McMahon Elementary School (K–6)

Private schools
 The Discovery School (PK-12)
 Saint-Dominic Academy
 Vineyard Christian School (PK-12)

Media

Newspapers
 The Sun Journal prints a daily newspaper in four different editions statewide. The Sun Journal was the recipient of the 2008 New England Daily Newspaper of the Year and the 2009 Maine Press Association Newspaper of the Year.
 Lewiston Evening Journal ran from 1866 to 1989.
 The Twin City Times is a free weekly newspaper printed in Auburn. It is publicly available in Lewiston as well. It features local news and short articles.

Television
Lewiston is part of the Portland television market, and receives all major channels in that market. WGME-TV and WCSH both have local bureaus in the city, and are across the street from each other on Main Street.

Radio
Five radio stations are licensed to serve the city of Lewiston. These stations are:
WARX/93.9, airing a non-commercial religious format. It is the former sister station of WCOU, now WIGY.
WIGY/1240, airing an adult contemporary format simulcasting WEZR.
 WFNK 107.5, which is branded as 107.5 Frank FM and airs a classic hits format that is targeted primarily at Portland area listeners.
 WLAM 1470, which airs a standards format branded as The Memories Station.
 WRBC 91.5, which is the college radio station of Bates College.

Infrastructure

Transportation

Public transportation
The city of Lewiston uses the Citylink or Purple Bus system. Passengers use Citylink in collaboration with Auburn and Lisbon.

The downtown shuttle runs through the downtown of both Lewiston and Auburn. It maintains only one line that goes into Lisbon. The Citylink services on average approximately 235,000 people a year.

Roadways and major routes
 Interstate 95 / Maine Turnpike: Formerly Interstate 495, runs through Lewiston. Exit 80 serves the city via Alfred Plourde Parkway in the Industrial Park. I-95 provides a connection to Portland being 40 minutes away, Bangor about 90 minutes away, and Boston, about two hours away from the Lewiston Exit.
 U.S. Route 202 / Maine State Routes 11 and 100: These three routes run through Lewiston along Main Street. It runs straight through the center of downtown to the business parks outside town, and the northern Lewiston suburbs. Connects Lewiston to Auburn and Greene. Provides fast transportation to Augusta and Kennebec Valley.
 Maine State Route 196: Starts in Lewiston at U.S. Route 202, Main Street. In Lewiston it is Canal Street, which turns into Lisbon Street. This route connects Lewiston to Lisbon, and provides easy access to the towns of Topsham and Brunswick. This route ends on U.S. Route 1 in the City of Brunswick. It connects to Interstate 295 in Topsham.
 Maine State Route 126: Starts in Lewiston at US Route 202, Main Street. In Lewiston it is Sabattus Street and connects Lewiston to the town of Sabattus.

Bridges
 Vietnam Veterans Memorial Bridge: Built in 1973 to commemorate the veterans of the Vietnam War. It connects Lewiston to Auburn. It provides fast transportation from Russell Street, and Main Street to Auburn's Mt. Auburn Ave, and shopping centers on Center Street and the Mall Area.
 Governor James B. Longley Memorial Bridge: Connects Main Street in downtown Lewiston to Court Street in Downtown Auburn. Named after Lewiston resident and Governor of Maine James B. Longley.
 Bernard Lown Peace Bridge: Connects Little Canada and New Auburn. Starts in Lewiston as Cedar Street and starts in Auburn as Broad Street. Commemorates former Lewiston resident and Nobel Peace Prize recipient Bernard Lown.

Airports and bus station

 Auburn/Lewiston Municipal Airport: The official airport of the two cities. It currently provides general aviation facilities. Although the city is serviced by an airport, most people use the Portland International Jetport for commercial flights in and out of the state.
 Oak Street Bus Station: Greyhound Lines operates a bus line out of Lewiston. The bus lines go as far as Bangor and Boston. From those two destinations more travel opportunities are available.
 Concord Coach Lines – Great Falls Plaza/Bates College: Provides bus direct transportation to Logan International Airport and South Station in Boston, with multiple trips daily.

Hydroelectric Energy Generation
 In outer Lewiston at the end of Switzerland Road there is the Gulf Island hydroelectric dam operated by Brookfield White Pine Hydro and Central Maine Power Company. It generates electricity via the waterflow of the Androscoggin River. Its nameplate capacity is 19.2MW
 Further down the river is the Deer Rips hydroelectric dam, also operated by Brookfield White Pine Hydro and Central Maine Power Company. Its nameplate capacity is 10.1MW
 Further down the river is the Charles E. Monty hydroelectric dam, also operated by Brookfield White Pine Hydro and Central Maine Power Company. Its nameplate capacity is 28.4MW

Notable people

In popular culture
 The Farmers' Almanac is printed in Lewiston.
 Lewiston is the setting for the fictitious Kingdom Hospital, featured in the thirteen-episode miniseries developed by horror writer Stephen King and based on a Danish mini-series, The Kingdom. In 1999 when King was struck by a car while walking in Lovell, he was flown by helicopter and treated at Central Maine Medical Center in Lewiston. In the mini-series, the hospital is built on the site of a textile mill which made military uniforms during the Civil War, which the Bates Mill and other Lewiston textile factories actually did. King attended elementary school in the nearby town of Durham and high school in the neighboring town of Lisbon Falls.
 Twins Francis Edgar Stanley and Freelan O. Stanley invented the photographic dry plate process, that they used in their studio on Lisbon Street in the late 19th century. They later sold the patent to a company that became Eastman Kodak. They eventually went on to invent the Stanley Steamer.

References

Further reading
 Elder, Janus G., A History of Lewiston, Maine with a Genealogical Register of Early Families. Heritage Books, Inc., 1989
 Hodgkin, Douglas I., Lewiston Memories: A Bicentennial Pictorial. Jostens Printing & Publishing, 1994
 Finnegan, William, Letter from Maine: New in Town, the Somalis of Lewiston. The New Yorker, December 11, 2006
 Hodgkin, Douglas I., Frontier to Industrial City:Lewiston Town Politics 1768–1863. Just Write Books, Topsham, ME, 2008
 Richard, Mark Paul. Loyal but French: The Negotiation of Identity by French-Canadian Descendants in the United States (2008) on acculturation in Lewiston since 1860

External links

 
 Downtown Lewiston Association Downtown Lewiston Maine

 
Populated places established in 1770
Cities in Androscoggin County, Maine
1770 establishments in Maine
Cities in Maine